Ximénez or Ximenez is a Spanish family name. Variants include Giménez (or Gimenez), Jiménez (or Jimenez), and Ximenes.

Notable people with the name or pseudonym include:

Fortún Ximénez (died 1533), Spanish sailor who led a mutiny during an early expedition along the coast of Mexico
Francisco Ximénez (1666–1729), Spanish Catholic priest known for his conservation and translation of the Popol Vuh
Francisco Ximénez de Tejada (1703–1775), the 69th Grand Master of the Knights Hospitaller
José Ximénez (1601–1672), Spanish organist and composer
Juan Ximenez and his father Miguel Ximénez (artist), Spanish Renaissance painters
Juan Ximénez Cerdán (1355–1435), lawyer and legal theorist, Justicia Mayor of the Kingdom of Aragon 1390–1423
Mariana Diaz Ximenez, (born 1983), East Timorese athlete who specialises in the marathon
Miguel Alberto Flangini Ximénez (1824–1900), Uruguayan political figure
Miguel Ximénez (born 1977), Uruguayan footballer (striker)

See also
 Giménez
 Jiménez

Surnames of Spanish origin